In homotopy theory, a branch of mathematics, a Quillen adjunction between two closed model categories C and D is a special kind of adjunction between categories that induces an adjunction between the homotopy categories Ho(C) and Ho(D) via the total derived functor construction. Quillen adjunctions are named in honor of the mathematician Daniel Quillen.

Formal definition
Given two closed model categories C and D, a Quillen adjunction is a pair
(F, G): C  D
of adjoint functors with F left adjoint to G such that F preserves cofibrations and trivial cofibrations or, equivalently by the closed model axioms, such that G preserves fibrations and trivial fibrations. In such an adjunction F is called the left Quillen functor and G is called the right Quillen functor.

Properties
It is a consequence of the axioms that a left (right) Quillen functor preserves weak equivalences between cofibrant (fibrant) objects. The total derived functor theorem of Quillen says that the total left derived functor
LF: Ho(C) → Ho(D)
is a left adjoint to the total right derived functor
RG: Ho(D) → Ho(C).
This adjunction (LF, RG) is called the derived adjunction.

If (F, G) is a Quillen adjunction as above such that
F(c) → d
with c cofibrant and d fibrant is a weak equivalence in D if and only if
c → G(d)
is a weak equivalence in C then it is called a Quillen equivalence of the closed model categories C and D. In this case the derived adjunction is an adjoint equivalence of categories so that
LF(c) → d
is an isomorphism in Ho(D) if and only if 
c → RG(d)
is an isomorphism in Ho(C).

References
 
  
 Philip S. Hirschhorn, Model Categories and Their Localizations, American Mathematical Soc., Aug 24, 2009 - Mathematics - 457 pages

Homotopy theory
Theory of continuous functions
Adjoint functors